Best of B.T.O. (So Far) (1976, Mercury Records) is a compilation album by Bachman–Turner Overdrive that contains material from their first five studio albums. "Gimme Your Money Please," a cut from the band's 1973 debut album, was released as a single in 1976 to support this greatest hits package.

A remastered version was released in 1998, titled Best of B.T.O. (Remastered Hits), which added the tracks "Four Wheel Drive", "Free Wheelin'", and "Down to the Line". The European issue added another six tracks.  All songs were also full-length album versions, though in the U.S. the single edit of "Let It Ride" was used.

Track listing
"Roll On Down the Highway" (Robbie Bachman, C.F. Turner) - 3:56
"Hey You" (Randy Bachman) - 3:33
"Lookin' Out for #1" (Randy Bachman) - 5:20
"Gimme Your Money Please" (C.F. Turner) - 4:21
"Let It Ride" (Randy Bachman, C.F. Turner) - 3:33
"Take It Like a Man" (C.F. Turner, Blair Thornton) - 3:40
"You Ain't Seen Nothing Yet" (Randy Bachman) - 3:38
"Blue Collar" (C.F. Turner) - 6:05
"Takin' Care of Business" (Randy Bachman) - 4:45

Additional tracks on Best of B.T.O. (Remastered Hits) - 1998

Additional tracks on the European Best of B.T.O. (Remastered Hits) - 1998

Additional tracks on the Brazilian Best of B.T.O. (Remastered Hits) - 1998

Lineup
Tracks 1, 2, 3, 6 and 7:
Randy Bachman - lead guitar, vocals
C.F. "Fred" Turner - bass, vocals
Blair Thornton - 2nd lead guitar, backing vocals
Robbie Bachman - drums
Tracks 4, 5, 8 and 9:
Randy Bachman - lead guitar, vocals
C.F. "Fred" Turner - bass, vocals
Tim Bachman - guitar, backing vocals
Robbie Bachman - drums

Personnel

 Bachman-Turner Overdrive: Composer, Performer, Primary Artist
 Randy Bachman: Composer, Producer, Guitar, Vocals
 Blair Thornton: Composer, Guitar, Backing Vocals
 Tim Bachman: Guitar, Backing Vocals
 C.F. Turner: Composer, Bass, Vocals
 Robbie Bachman: Composer, Drums
 Little Richard: Piano (Guest Artist)
 Norman Durkee: Piano (Guest Artist)
 Barry Keane: Congas (Guest Artist)

Charts
Album

Singles

Certifications

References 

Bachman–Turner Overdrive compilation albums
1976 greatest hits albums
Mercury Records compilation albums